Beauty Has Grace is the Christian singer Jaci Velasquez' fifth studio album. It marks a departure in style from her previous albums, having been recorded in London, England, with Martin Terefe (A-Ha, Ron Sexsmith, Leona Naess, KT Tunstall). She co-wrote six of the ten album tracks.

Velasquez decided to name the album "Kensaltown", after Kensal Town and the studio where she recorded and wrote the album, but the label was concerned that people would confuse "Kensaltown" with "Tinsel Town" so they changed it to Beauty Has Grace, a line in the song "This Love". The release date for the album was pushed back several times to May 3. The label also changed the track listing of the album which first featured the song "Hold On to This Moment", but it was replaced for "Reason to Believe"

Reviews for the album were favorable, calling Velasquez's musical change "the boldest, smartest Christian music artistic shift in recent memory". A special edition of the album was released by Family Christian Stores with a bonus track, "Love Will Find You".

Track listing
 "I'm Not Looking Down" – 3:47 (Jaci Velasquez, Michael Clarke, Martin Terefe)
 "With All My Soul" – 3:59 (Jaci Velasquez, Marc Byrd, Steve Hindalong)
 "Prayer to Love" – 4:08 (Jaci Velasquez, Hunter Davis, Chris Faulk)
 "Lay It Down" – 4:01 (Chris Eaton, Don Poythress, Brian White)
 "Something Beautiful" – 3:28 (Jeremy Rose, Yancy)
 "Tonight" – 3:52; Feat. Michael Clarke (Marc Byrd)
 "When You Hold Me" – 3:19 (JT Dally, Andy Smith, Brian Lee, Chad Howat, John Heiner)
 "Reason to Believe" – 4:35 (Jaci Velasquez, Brad Jacoby, Martin Terefe)
 "Supernatural" – 3:31 (Jaci Velasquez, Darren Potuck, Martin Terefe, Nick Whitecross)
 "This Love" – 4:09 (Jaci Velasquez, Martin Terefe)

Singles
 "With All My Soul" 
 "Lay It Down"

Personnel

Performance credits
 Jaci Velasquez – primary artist, backing vocals
 Javier Solis – drums
 David Angell – violin
 Michael Clarke – background vocals
 David Davidson – violin
 Anthony LaMarchina – cello
 Kristin Wilkinson – viola
 Christer Jansson – percussion, drums
 Mark Lusk – acoustic guitar, electric guitar, soloist
 Claes Bjorklund – synthesizer, electric guitar
 Martin Terefe – acoustic guitar, bass guitar, percussion, piano, drums, electric guitar, background vocals, Wurlitzer, Juno
 Abel Orta – bass guitar
 Ian Fitchuk – piano, keyboards, background vocals
 Nathaniel Chan – electric guitar
 Andreas Olsson – synthesizer, piano, electric guitar, mellotron, beat box, synthesizer bass, Wurlitzer

Technical credits
 Jaci Velasquez – producer, composer, executive producer
 Martin Terefe – producer, engineer
 Dionicio R. Lopez – producer, executive producer
 Andreas Olsson– programming, engineer, drum programming
 David Davidson – string arrangements
 Richard Dodd – mastering
 Kelly Pribble – engineer
 Jacquire King – engineer
 Claes Bjorklund – programming
 Nathaniel Chan – engineer
 Andy Hunt – vocal engineer

Charts

References

Jaci Velasquez albums
2005 albums
Albums recorded at Kensaltown Studios